The Hong Kong International Bowls Classic is an international lawn bowls competition. It is one of the most prestigious events on the lawn bowls calendar. It started out as a pairs competition for men in 1981, with a singles event added for men in 1983 and later singles and pairs competition for women added to the programme in 2008.

The event was cancelled in 2019 due to the 2019–20 Hong Kong protests and the 2020 and 2021 editions were cancelled due to the COVID-19 pandemic.

Men's Finalists

Women's Finalists

See also
 World Bowls Events

References

External links 
 Hong Kong Lawn Bowls Association

Bowls competitions
Bowls in Hong Kong
International sports competitions hosted by Hong Kong
Annual sporting events in Hong Kong
Recurring sporting events established in 1981
1981 establishments in Hong Kong